Oskar Speck (4. March 1907 – 27. March 1993) was a German canoeist who kayaked from Germany to Australia. He left Germany to seek work due to being an unemployed electrical contractor in Hamburg. He initially intended to kayak to Cyprus to work in the copper mines but ended up wanting to continue the journey through Southeast Asia and the Middle East to Australia. Oskar departed from Ulm, Germany in 1932 and arrived in Australia in 1939, at the beginning of the second world war. He was accused of being a spy and was imprisoned in a prisoner-of-war camp. When the war ended, Oskar was released from imprisonment and later became a successful opal merchant in Sydney.

Early life 
In 1921, aged 14, Oskar left school to work. During the 1920s, kayaking was becoming increasingly popular sport throughout Europe. One of the most common kayaks from the time was called a Sunnschien, which was manufactured by faltboots. They consisted of treated canvas skin that was pulled over a wooden frame. However, as the great depression struck after the first world war, Oskar was unable to find work in his hometown.

The voyage

Germany to Cyprus 
Due to the lack of money and the rumours of miners being needed in the Cypriot mines, Oskar decided to kayak, disregarding the risks including dangerous conditions and his inability to swim, Oskar began his journey in May 1932.  Oskar left his town of Ulm by kayaking down the river of Danube until he left Germany and entered Romania. He continued to follow the river until he reached the Bulgarian border. Upon reaching Bulgaria, he left the Danube river and paddled out into the Aegean Sea. Out at sea, Oskar was paddling through high swell and large waves, he had never kayaked out at sea, he narrowly avoided a collision with a cargo ship. Oskar added sails to his kayak as well as splashguards to make the kayak more efficient as well as to keep the kayak from filling up. After these modifications, Oskar was able to travel through the Aegean and the Mediterranean seas by going along the islands and following the coast of Turkey before reaching Cyprus.

Cyprus to Australia   
As Oskar arrived in Cyprus, he continued his adventure and paddled to Australia. To get there he travelled east to Syria to reach the Euphrates River, which he then kayaked down on through Iraq to get to the Persian Gulf. Along the Euphrates, Oskar experienced a lack of food and water, intense heat as well as regularly being shot at by the locals. Further into his trip down the Euphrates River, Oskar was stranded on a small island with a corpse, where he waited for a week for a storm to pass. When Oskar reached the Gulf, he continued to paddle down along the coast of Iran where he stayed for six months waiting for a new kayak to arrive. However, during his wait, he became ill and contracted malaria, which stayed with him throughout the rest of the voyage. Oskar did not resume his voyage until September 1934, when he continued east through the Arabian Sea. After a few months, Oskar arrived on the coast of Pakistan, where he stopped at various ports to trade stories of his voyage for food, water, and shelter. This allowed him to gain fame which further allowed him to fund the rest of his trip. Around this period, Nazi Germany had begun to develop, as a result, rumours of Oskar being a German spy also began to develop. Various stories of Oskar's kayak being able to fly, and dive led to him being arrested at the next port he rested at; however, he was released two days later and resumed his trip. As Oskar reached Sri Lanka, he spent three months there to avoid the monsoon season.

When the monsoon season passed and Oskar was back on the water, he reached Chennai where he got a new kayak. He then continued to travel along the coast of India until he reached Kolkata in January 1936. A few months later, just off the Burmese coast, Oskar happened to kayak through another monsoon. He would be driven off course, and he would spend 30–40 hours paddling to get himself back on route. As Oskar left Singapore on another new kayak, he headed to Jakarta, from which he continued to paddle east. However, he was often dehydrated, exhausted and sunburnt and unable to find a food supply. During this stage in his voyage, Oskar was also stricken down with malaria again, as a result the voyage was again interrupted. During this period, locals who were initially welcoming of Oskar, would turn hostile due to the language barrier between the German migrant and the locals. An incident occurred in Indonesia where he was beaten by 20 men leaving him semi-conscious with a punctured eardrum. Oskar managed to escape by chewing through the ropes he was tied with before sailing away in his kayak. Oskars recount on this incident as documented in the Australasian Post Magazine:"The other natives closed in. Five or six of them held me down, half in and half out of the kayak. They all clung to me like leeches. Strong hands clutched my hair. With the strength of despair I tore one hand free from them and strove to pull the hands from my throat... With strips of dried buffalo hide some of them tied my legs and hands, while others looted the kayak. By the hair, they dragged my trussed body some yards across the sand. They constantly kicked me. They picked me up, carried me a short distance, then dropped me a few yards from the water."Back out at sea, he was not permitted to travel a shorter route, but rather a longer via the north of New Guinea. Oskar reached Port Moresby in August, before continuing down to the Saibai Island in the far north of Australia, in September 1939. The voyage took Oskar seven years and four months. Upon arrival, a group of locals welcomed Oskar, but he was arrested by three police officers among the locals and sent to a prisoner-of-war camp due to his German background. The three officers welcoming and congratulating Oskar as documented as in the Australasian Post Magazine: “Well done, feller... You’ve made it — Germany to Australia in that. But now we’ve got a piece of bad news for you. You are an enemy alien. We are going to intern you.”

After the journey 
Oskar was first sent to a prisoner-of-war camp on Thursday Island for one month. He was then sent to Brisbane then to Loveday Internment camp in Victoria where he escaped the camp, but was recaptured and sent to South Australia where he stayed until the end of the war. Oskar was released in January 1946 and within a week of his release he found work in an opal mine in Lightning Ridge, New South Wales. He got his citizenship and settled into postwar Australia to establish a successful opal cutting and trading business. In the 1970s, Oskar built his own home Killcare Heights on the New South Wales Central Coast before retiring. His partner, Nancy Steele, would commute from Sydney to Killcare every week for 30 years to see him until she moved in with him in 1993. In the 1970s, Oskar also managed to travel back to Germany, however he did not really enjoy it, so he returned back to Australia. Oskar died in 1995 aged 87–88 years of an undisclosed illness.

Oskar's legacy 
Even though Oskar's adventures were reported in Europe, very few knew about his accomplishments in Australia. Shortly after his arrival in Australia, Oskar planned on publishing his photographs and write about his experiences, however he did not end up doing this. Most of Oskar's original photographs, letters and journals remain in the Australian National Maritime Museum, photographs of his original letters and journals as well as his original photographs are available on their website. One of Oskar's double ended paddles from his voyage was presented to Carl Toovey as a trophy for the 100 mile Cruising Canoe Club’s Nepean Marathon on the Hawkesbury River in 1952. This was the first canoeing marathon to take place in Australia. Over time, Carl and Oskar became friends and began canoeing around Pittwater and Sydney Harbour together. Oskar's opinions on his popularity as documented in the Australasian Post Magazine:  “But would Australians recognise my authority to speak about it? In Germany, I was a recognised kayakist before 1932. As my voyage progressed and reports of it went home from Cyprus, from Greece, from India, I became acknowledged as the most experienced sea-going kayak expert in the world... But the mass of Australians did not know me at all — except, perhaps, as a name appearing from time to time in local newspapers which briefly recorded the progress of the earlier parts of my voyage.” Sandy Robson is a woman from Western Australia who retraced Oskar's voyage by using a sea-kayak to paddle approximately 23,000 kilometres. She started the voyage at the age of 42 and spent 5 and half years on her journey from Germany to Australia. In an interview with the Australian Broadcasting Corporation in 2016, she claimed that she was inspired by the voyage of German Oskar Speck in the late 1930s. Unlike Oskar, she did not face political issues as Australian Border Force personnel were on hand to provide customs clearance; however, she encountered crocodiles, pirates and malaria. Although Sandy documented her voyage in detail on her blog ‘Sea Kayaker Sandy’, she claimed that like Oskar, she also wants to write a book about her voyage. During her interview with The Australian Broadcasting Corporation she also claimed:"I was just captured by the journey he made and inspired to relive that journey in modern times... I've tried also to take something into myself from each of the different cultures as I've travelled across the world... I've been in 20 different countries — there are really fantastic things in each of those cultures that I've experienced."

References

1907 births
1993 deaths
Kayakers
German emigrants to Australia
World War II civilian prisoners